The Russian Journal of Earth Sciences is a peer-reviewed scientific journal published by the Geophysical Center of the Russian Academy of Sciences. The journal published works of Russian scientists in English. The journal was established in 1998 and the editor-in-chief is Alexey Gvishiani.

See also
Fennia
GFF

Geology journals
Geology of Russia
English-language journals
Publications established in 1998